Dre is a given name. Notable people with the name include:

Dre Allen (born 1975), American musician
Dre Babinski (born 1985), American musician
Dre Barnes, American football player
Dré Bly (born 1977), American football player
Dre Deas (born 1997), American soccer player
Dre Fortune (born 1996), American-born Trinidadian footballer
Dre Greenlaw (born 1997), American football player
Dre Harris, American musician
Dre Kirkpatrick (born 1989), American football player
Dre Lyon, member of American music production duo Cool & Dre
Dre Moon (born 1991), American musician
Dre Moore (born 1985), American football player
Dre Murray (born 1981), American rapper
Dre Russ (born 1988), nickname of Jamaican cricketer Andre Russell
Dré Saris (1921–1995), Dutch footballer
Dré Thies (born 1967), American rower

See also
 Dr. Dre, American record producer and rapper
 Doctor Dré, American radio and TV personality
Dre Dog, American rapper
 Mac Dre, American rapper

Given names